Oh, What A Night is a 1944 crime drama starring Edmund Lowe & Jean Parker and directed by William Beaudine.

The film's story was written by Marian Orth and the screenplay by Paul Gerard Smith.

Plot
Jewel thieves Rand, Tom Gordon, Rocco, Boris, and Countess Sonya meet at the California Hotel to await Lillian Vanderhoven, a former burlesque dancer who is now a wealthy dowager and has acquired an expensive diamond known as the "Kimberly King Diamond". Alongside the group is Valerie, Gordon's niece. Valerie meets Rand and becomes convinced he and Gordon are friends on vacation. Rand meets a guest at the hotel, Detective Norris, who convinces him to make sure that the gemstone remains safe.  

After Vanderhoven arrives to the hotel, Rand's valet Wyndy is with her, having posed as an English nobleman. Wyndy wishes to steal Vanderhoven's diamond, but learns of Rand's promise to Detective Norris.

That evening at a dinner party, Gordon dances with Vanderhoven and promptly steals the diamond. Rand decides to retrieve the gemstone, but doesn't want to alert Valerie, to whom he has become fond of, to the fact that her uncle is a thief. While Gordon is packing his suitcase in front of Valerie, Rand forces him to hand over the diamond at gunpoint. This act intentionally leaves Valerie thinking that Rand was the thief instead of Gordon. After leaving the gem with Norris, Rand and Wyndy leave the hotel. Due to his generous act, Rand convinces himself that there is honor among thieves.

Cast
 Edmund Lowe as Rand
 Jean Parker as Valerie
 Marjorie Rambeau as Lil Vanderhoven
 Alan Dinehart as Detective Norris
 Pierre Watkin as Tom Gordon
 Ivan Lebedeff as Boris
 Claire Du Brey as Petrie
 Charles F. Miller as Sutton
 Olaf Hytten as Wyndy
 Karin Lang as Sonya
 George J. Lewis as Rocco
 Crane Whitley as Sullivan
 Charles Jordan as Murphy
 Dick Rush as Healy
 Eddie Cherkose

References

1944 films
Monogram Pictures films
Films directed by William Beaudine
1944 crime drama films
American crime drama films
American black-and-white films
1940s English-language films
1940s American films